C. lepidus may refer to:
 Calomys lepidus, a mouse species
 Cercartetus lepidus, a possum species
 Ceyx lepidus, a kingfisher species
 Chalcoscirtus lepidus, a jumping spider species in the genus Chalcoscirtus
 Crotalus lepidus, a pitviper species
 Cuculus lepidus, a cuckoo species
 Cycloctenus lepidus, a spider species in the genus Cycloctenus endemic to New Zealand

See also
 Lepidus (disambiguation)